Kurka (also Romanized as Kūrkā; also known as Kūrpī) is a village in Kurka Rural District, in the Central District of Astaneh-ye Ashrafiyeh County, Gilan Province, Iran. At the 2006 census, its population was 2,206, in 635 families.

References

See also 

 Christopher Kurka

Populated places in Astaneh-ye Ashrafiyeh County